, better known by his ring name Koudai, is a Japanese kickboxer. He currently compets in the super flyweight division of RISE.

As of October 2022, he is ranked as the fourth best strawweight (-54kg) kickboxer in the world by Combat Press and the sixth best flyweight (-53kg) kickboxer in the world by Beyond Kick.

Kickboxing career

Early career
After winning his debut fight against Ogre Maruhata, Koudai would win his next six fights as well. He defeated Kyo Kawakami at Shoot Boxing 2017 act.1 on February 11, 2017. Some of the most notable victories during this run included Masashi Kumura and Jin Mandokoro.

His seven fight winning streak earned Koudai a chance to challenge Yoshiho Tane for the DEEP KICK -53kg championship at DEEP☆KICK 34 on December 17, 2017. Koudai won the fight by unanimous decision, with scores of 30–28, 29–28 and 30–29.

Koudai faced Yuuya Hayashi at NJKF WEST Young Fight 4th on August 19, 2018.. The fight ended in a majority decision draw, a career-first for Koudai.

Koudai faced Ponchan OZgym at Suk Wanchai MuayThai Super Fight vol.5 on September 24, 2019. He got back to his winning ways, as he won the fight by a first-round knockout. Koudai was next booked to face Yuuichi at HOOST CUP KINGS OSAKA 3 on October 28, 2018. He won the fight by a second-round technical knockout.

Hiroyama faced Masayoshi Kunimoto at HOOST CUP KINGS Nagoya 5 on December 23, 2018. The fight was ruled a unanimous decision draw, with two scorecards of 29–29 and one scorecard of 30–30. The two fought an immediate rematch at HOOST CUP KINGS Kyoto 5 on March 3, 2019. Hiroyama won the fight by a majority decision, with scores of 30–29, 29–29 and 29–28.

Koudai faced Koki Osaki for the vacant HOOST CUP -53kg title at HOOST CUP KINGS NAGOYA 6 on May 26, 2019. Hiroyama defeated Osaki by an extra round majority decision, with scores of 10–9, 10–9 and 10–10. Koudai made his first DEEP KICK -53kg title defense in a rematch with Jin Mandokoro at DEEP KICK 40 on September 15, 2019. Koudai won the rematch by unanimous decision, with scores of 29–28, 30–29 and 30–28. 

Hiroyama faced Kazuki Osaki in a non-title bout at HOOST CUP KINGS OSAKA 4 on October 27, 2019. Hiroyama lost the fight by majority decision, with scores of 30–29, 29–29 and 30–29. Koudai made his first HOOST CUP -53kg title defense against King Takeshi at HOOST CUP KINGS OSAKA 5 on October 18, 2020. He won the fight by unanimous decision.

RISE
Koudai was booked to face Shiro in the quarterfinals of the 2021 RISE Dead or Alive -53kg Tournament, which was held at RISE WORLD SERIES 2021 Osaka on July 18, 2021. The bout was ruled a split decision draw after the first three rounds, which led to an extension round being contested. Shiro was awarded a unanimous decision after the extra round, with all three judges scoring the fight 10–8 in his favor, as Koudai was knocked down with a one-two midway through the round. 

Hirayama was expected to face Koki Osaki in a tournament reserve match at RISE WORLD SERIES 2021 Yokohama on September 23, 2021. Osaki was later rescheduled to face Shiro in the tournament semifinals, as a replacement for his brother Kazuki Osaki, who withdrew with an ankle injury. As Osaki later missed weight, he was in turn replaced by Hirayama. Kodai lost the fight by unanimous decision.

Koudai faced Azusa Kaneko at HOOST CUP KINGS KYOTO 9 〜REVERSAL〜 on March 27, 2022. He won the fight by unanimous decision. After successfully snapping his two-fight losing skid, Koudai was scheduled to face Ryu Hanaoka at RISE 159 on June 24, 2022. He lost the fight by unanimous decision, with all three judges scoring the fight 30–29 for him.

Koudai faced Auto Muangphapoon in a -55kg bout at HOOST CUP KINGS KYOTO 10 on October 16, 2022. He lost the fight by majority decision.

Koudai faced the one-time RISE super flyweight title challenger Jin Mandokoro at RISE 163 on December 10, 2022. He lost the fight by unanimous decision, with all three judges scoring the bout 30–29 in his favor.

Koudai made his second HOOST CUP -53 kg title defense against Ryuki Matsuda at HOOST CUP KINGS KYOTO 11 on March 5, 2023. He lost the fight by unanimous decision, with two scorecards of 50–46 and one scorecard of 50–47. Koudai was knocked down with a left hook in the fourth round.

Championships and accomplishments

Amateur
Shoot Boxing
2014 Shootboxing Kansai -55kg Champion
Shin Karate
2015 Shin Karate All Japan K-2 Grand Prix Lightweight Champion
2015 Dageki Kakutougi Japan Cup -55kg Runner-up

Professional
HOOST CUP
 2019 HOOST CUP -53kg Championship
 One successful title defense

DEEP KICK
 2017 DEEP KICK -53kg Championship
 One successful title defense

Fight record

|-  style="text-align:center; background:#fbb;"
| 2023-03-05 || Loss||align=left| Ryuki Matsuda || HOOST CUP KINGS KYOTO 11 || Kyoto, Japan|| Decision (Unanimous)|| 5 ||3:00  
|-
! style=background:white colspan=9 |
|-  style="background:#fbb;"
| 2022-12-10|| Loss ||align=left| Jin Mandokoro || RISE 163 || Tokyo, Japan || Decision (Unanimous)|| 3 ||3:00 
|-  style="text-align:center; background:#fbb;"
| 2022-10-16 || Loss ||align=left| Autor Muangphapoon || HOOST CUP KINGS KYOTO 10 || Kyoto, Japan || Decision (Majority)||  3||3:00
|-  style="text-align:center; background:#fbb;"
| 2022-06-24|| Loss||align=left| Ryu Hanaoka || RISE 159 || Tokyo, Japan || Decision (Unanimous)||  3||3:00
|-  style="text-align:center; background:#cfc;"
| 2022-03-27|| Win ||align=left| Azusa Kaneko || HOOST CUP KINGS KYOTO 9 〜REVERSAL〜  || Kyoto, Japan || Decision (Unanimous) || 3 ||3:00 
|-  style="text-align:center; background:#fbb;"
| 2021-09-23|| Loss||align=left| Shiro || RISE WORLD SERIES 2021 Yokohama - Dead or Alive Tournament, Semi Finals || Yokohama, Japan || Decision (Unanimous)|| 3 ||3:00
|-  style="text-align:center; background:#fbb;"
| 2021-07-18|| Loss ||align=left| Shiro || RISE WORLD SERIES 2021 Osaka - Dead or Alive Tournament, Quarter Final || Osaka, Japan || Ext.R Decision (Unanimous) || 4 ||3:00
|-  style="text-align:center; background:#cfc;"
| 2021-03-07|| Win ||align=left| Jomrawee RefinasGym || HOOST CUP KINGS KYOTO 7  || Kyoto, Japan || Decision (Unanimous) || 3 || 3:00
|-  style="text-align:center; background:#cfc;"
| 2020-10-18 || Win ||align=left| King Takeshi || HOOST CUP KINGS OSAKA 5 || Osaka, Japan|| Decision (Unanimous) || 3 || 3:00 
|-
! style=background:white colspan=9 |
|-  style="text-align:center; background:#FFBBBB;"
| 2019-10-27 ||Loss ||align=left| Kazuki Osaki || HOOST CUP KINGS OSAKA 4 || Osaka, Japan|| Decision (Majority) || 3 || 3:00
|-  style="text-align:center; background:#cfc;"
| 2019-09-15 || Win||align=left| Jin Mandokoro || DEEP☆KICK 40|| Osaka, Japan || Decision (Unanimous) || 3 || 3:00
|-
! style=background:white colspan=9 |
|-  style="text-align:center; background:#cfc;"
| 2019-05-26 || Win||align=left| Koki Osaki || HOOST CUP KINGS NAGOYA 6|| Nagoya, Japan || Ext.R Decision (Majority) || 4 || 3:00
|-
! style=background:white colspan=9 |
|-  style="text-align:center; background:#cfc;"
| 2019-03-03 || Win||align=left| Masayoshi Kunimoto || HOOST CUP KINGS KYOTO 5|| Kyoto, Japan || Decision (Majority) || 3 || 3:00
|-  style="text-align:center; background:#c5d2ea;"
| 2018-12-23 ||Draw||align=left| Masayoshi Kunimoto || HOOST CUP KINGS NAGOYA 5|| Nagoya, Japan || Decision (Unanimous) || 3 || 3:00
|-  style="text-align:center; background:#cfc;"
| 2018-10-28 || Win||align=left| Yuuichi || HOOST CUP KINGS OSAKA 3|| Osaka, Japan || TKO (Doctor Stoppage)|| 2 || 1:57
|-  style="text-align:center; background:#cfc;"
| 2018-09-24 || Win||align=left| Ponchan OZgym || Suk Wanchai MuayThai Super Fight vol.5|| Aichi Prefecture, Japan || KO (High Kick)|| 1 ||
|-  style="text-align:center; background:#c5d2ea;"
| 2018-08-19 ||Draw||align=left| Yuuya Hayashi || NJKF WEST Young Fight 4th|| Osaka, Japan || Decision (Majority) || 3 || 3:00
|-  style="text-align:center; background:#cfc;"
| 2017-12-17 || Win||align=left| Yoshiho Tane || DEEP☆KICK 34|| Osaka, Japan || Decision (Unanimous)|| 3 || 3:00
|-
! style=background:white colspan=9 |
|-  style="text-align:center; background:#CCFFCC;"
| 2017-07-16|| Win||align=left| Jin Mandokoro || DEEP☆KICK 33|| Osaka, Japan || Decision (Split) || 3 || 3:00
|-  style="text-align:center; background:#CCFFCC;"
| 2017-04-09|| Win ||align=left| Masashi Kumura || DEEP☆KICK 32 || Osaka, Japan || KO (Left High Kick) || 2 || 2:26
|-  style="text-align:center; background:#cfc;"
| 2017-02-11 || Win||align=left| Kyo Kawakami || SHOOT BOXING 2017 act.1|| Tokyo, Japan || KO (Straight Right) || 2 || 2:02
|-  style="text-align:center; background:#cfc;"
| 2016-10-02 || Win||align=left| Kazane || HOOST CUP KINGS OSAKA|| Osaka, Japan || Decision (Unanimous)|| 3 || 3:00
|-  style="text-align:center; background:#cfc;"
| 2016-06-05 || Win||align=left| Hiroaki Ookuwa || SHOOT BOXING 2016 act.3|| Tokyo, Japan || Decision (Unanimous) || 3 || 3:00
|-  style="text-align:center; background:#cfc;"
| 2016-05-22 || Win||align=left| Ken Taniguchi || HIGHSPEED EX	|| Osaka, Japan || Decision || 3 || 3:00
|-  style="text-align:center; background:#cfc;"
| 2015-10-03 || Win||align=left| Ogre Maruhata ||SHOOT BOXING THE LAST BOMB || Osaka, Japan || Decision (Unanimous) || 3 || 3:00
|-
| colspan=9 | Legend:    

|-  style="background:#fbb;"
| 2015-10-24 || Loss||align=left| Hiroto Ishitsuka || Amateur Dageki Kakutougi Japan Cup 2015, Final|| Tokyo, Japan || Decision  ||  || 
|-
! style=background:white colspan=9 |
|-  style="background:#cfc;"
| 2015-10-24 || Win||align=left| Shun Sato || Amateur Dageki Kakutougi Japan Cup 2015, Semi Final|| Tokyo, Japan || ||  ||
|-  style="background:#cfc;"
| 2015-10-24 || Win||align=left| Jun Nojo|| Amateur Dageki Kakutougi Japan Cup 2015, Quarter Final|| Tokyo, Japan || ||  ||
|-  style="background:#cfc;"
| 2015-01-18 || Win||align=left| Kyouji Watano || SHOOT BOXING Amateur|| Osaka, Japan || Decision (Unanimous) || 2 || 2:00
|-  style="background:#FFBBBB;"
| 2014-10-05 ||Loss||align=left| Genki Takeno || SHOOT BOXING Amateur|| Nagoya, Japan || Ex.R Decision || 3 || 2:00
|-  style="background:#cfc;"
| 2014-06-29 || Win||align=left| Hiroki Kasahara || SHOOT BOXING Amateur|| Osaka, Japan || Decision || 2 || 2:00
|-  style="background:#cfc;"
| 2014-03-23 || Win||align=left| Kaiichi Kitayama || HOOST CUP LEGEND|| Nagoya, Japan || Decision || 2 || 2:00
|-  style="background:#cfc;"
| 2014-02-16 || Win||align=left| Yusuke Aoyama || SHOOT BOXING Amateur|| Osaka, Japan || Decision || 2 || 2:00
|-  style="background:#c5d2ea;"
| 2013-10-20 || Draw||align=left| Nobuhide Toyooka || NEXT LEVEL Kansai 10|| Osaka, Japan || Decision || 2 || 2:00
|-
| colspan=9 | Legend:

See also
List of male kickboxers

References

1998 births
Living people
Japanese male kickboxers
Flyweight kickboxers
Sportspeople from Hyōgo Prefecture
People from Amagasaki